Geneva Convention (1929) may refer to:

 Geneva Convention on Prisoners of War (1929)
 Geneva Convention on the Wounded and Sick (1929)